Celebrant may refer to:

Celebrant (Australia) - the civil celebrant movement began in Australia, in 1973 and there established its basic principles.

Celebrancy - Description of the profession of celebrancy.

Funeral celebrant Description, history, and ideals and principles of funeral celebrancy.

Celebrant Foundation and Institute - information about the pioneer non-profit organisation which established civil celebrants in the USA based on The Australian model.

Officiant - synonym for celebrant. Short article.

Humanist celebrant - describes the diaspora of Humanist Society celebrants throughout the world with a heavy emphasis on the non-religious.

Marriage officiant - religious and civil marriage in various religions and countries. 

"Celebrant" may also refer to:
 The Celebrant or Silverlode, a river in J. R. R. Tolkien's Middle-earth writings